One or two deltopectoral lymph nodes (or infraclavicular nodes) are found beside the cephalic vein, between the pectoralis major and deltoideus, immediately below the clavicle.

They are situated in the course of the external collecting trunks of the arm.

Additional images

References

External links

Lymphatics of the upper limb